Colynthaea coriacea is a species of beetle in the family Cerambycidae, the only species in the genus Colynthaea.

References

Piezocerini
Monotypic Cerambycidae genera